Pujilí Canton is one of seven cantons of the Cotopaxi Province in Ecuador. Its population at the 2001 census was 60,728.  Its capital is the town of Pujilí.

Subdivision 
The canton is divided into seven parishes, one urban parish, Pujilí, and six rural ones: 
 Angamarca 
 Guangaje 
 La Victoria
 Pílalo 
 Tingo 
 Zumbahua

Demographics 
Ethnic groups as of the Ecuadorian census of 2010:
Indigenous  51.8%
Mestizo  46.1%
White  1.0%
Afro-Ecuadorian  0.6%
Montubio  0.5%
Other  0.1%

References

External links 
 www.codeso.com / Map of Cotopaxi Province

Cantons of Cotopaxi Province